The FIBA Under-16 Women's Americas Championship is the Americas basketball championship for players under 16 years that take place every two years among national teams of the FIBA Americas zone. The event started in 2009. The top four finishers qualify for the FIBA Under-17 Women's World Cup.

Summary

Medal table

Participation details

See also
 FIBA Under-16 Americas Championship
 FIBA Under-17 Women's Basketball World Cup

External links
fibaamericas.com

 
Women's basketball competitions in the Americas between national teams
Amer
2009 establishments in North America
2009 establishments in South America
Recurring sporting events established in 2009